Faxén is a surname. Notable people with the surname include: 

Hilding Faxén (1892–1970), Swedish physicist 
Faxén's law
Magnus Faxén (1930–2018), Swedish journalist, diplomat, and TV executive

Swedish-language surnames